Nicolás Barrientos and Eduardo Struvay are the defending champions.

Seeds

Draw

References
 Main Draw

Seguros Bolivar Open- Doubles
2015 Doubles